The Port of Weihai is a seaport on the Yellow Sea in the vicinity of Weihai, Shandong, People's Republic of China.

History 
In 2011 the Port of Weihai, together with three other Chinese ports in East China's Shandong province, signed a strategic alliance with the largest port of the Republic of Korea (ROK). The alliance is jointly formed by Shandong's Qingdao Port, Port of Yantai, Port of Rizhao, Port of Weihai and the ROK's Port of Busan, aiming to build a shipping and logistics center in Northeast Asia.

References

External links
Port of Weihai website

Ports and harbours of China